Sankt Marienkirchen bei Schärding (German for "St. Mary's Church near Schärding") is a municipality in the district of Schärding in the Austrian state of Upper Austria.

Geography
Sankt Marienkirchen lies in the Innviertel. About 9 percent of the municipality is forest and 74 percent is farmland.

References

Cities and towns in Schärding District